Otto the Rich may refer to:
 Otto, Count of Ballenstedt (died 1123), the first Ascanian prince to call himself count of Anhalt; briefly named duke of Saxony
 Otto II, Margrave of Meissen (1125–1190)